George Walter Rose (19 February 1920 – 5 May 1988) was an English actor and singer in theatre and film. He won the Tony Award for Best Actor in a Musical for roles in My Fair Lady and The Mystery of Edwin Drood.

Early life
Born in Bicester, Oxfordshire, the son of a butcher, Rose studied at the Central School of Speech and Drama. After graduation, he was briefly a farmer and secretary. After wartime service and studies at Oxford, he made his Old Vic stage debut in 1946.

Career
Rose spent four years with the Old Vic company and made his Broadway debut in a 1946 production of Henry IV, Part I and continued to play in New York City and London's West End for the remainder of the decade. He spent most of the 1950s appearing in broad comedy roles in the UK, later joining the Royal Shakespeare Company. He returned to Broadway to portray Dogberry in Much Ado About Nothing in 1959. Two years later, he co-starred to much acclaim in Robert Bolt's A Man for All Seasons, first in London and then in New York. This included Variety naming him best supporting actor for his portrayal of the Common Man. From then on he appeared primarily in American plays and films.

Rose made his screen debut in Midnight Frolics in 1949 and went on to make more than 30 films. Notable film credits include The Pickwick Papers (1952), Track the Man Down (1955), A Night to Remember (1958), The Flesh and the Fiends (1959), Hawaii (1966), and A New Leaf (1971). Rose starred in the 1975 television series Beacon Hill, an Americanised version of Upstairs, Downstairs. Other television credits include Naked City, Trials of O'Brien, the mini-series Holocaust (1978), and several appearances on the Hallmark Hall of Fame.

On Broadway, among other roles, he played the First Gravedigger in John Gielgud's 1964 production of  Hamlet starring Richard Burton, a suspicious storekeeper in William Hanley's Slow Dance on the Killing Ground (1964), a bitter soldier in Peter Shaffer's Royal Hunt of the Sun (1965), and the detective in Joe Orton's Loot (1968). His first Tony Award nomination was for his portrayal of Louis Greff, Coco Chanel's friend, in the musical Coco in 1969. In the 1974 comedy My Fat Friend, opposite Lynn Redgrave, he won a Drama Desk Award and received another Tony nomination. In 1976, he finally won a Tony as Alfred P. Doolittle in the 20th anniversary Broadway revival of My Fair Lady. He received further acclaim in the role of General Burgoyne in The Devil's Disciple, as Mr. Darling and Captain Hook in Peter Pan and as one of Rex Harrison's co-stars in The Kingfisher; he won a 1979 Drama Desk Award for the last.

In 1980, he appeared as Major General Stanley in the hit Joe Papp adaptation of The Pirates of Penzance, co-starring Kevin Kline and Linda Ronstadt, being nominated for another Tony award. He also starred in the film adaptation of the production, released in 1983. Rose won his second Tony in 1986, for Rupert Holmes' musical adaptation of The Mystery of Edwin Drood. Rose was appearing in a national tour of Drood at the time of his death in 1988. His last film role was Pound Puppies and the Legend of Big Paw, in which he voiced the villain Marvin McNasty (and also sang one of the film's songs).

Personal life and death
Rose owned a pet lynx, birds, and other exotic creatures. He had a music collection numbering around 17,000 records.

In 1984, he purchased a holiday home in Sosúa, Dominican Republic where he spent much of his time between his performances. Rose was homosexual, and had no immediate family or permanent partner. He reportedly longed to have an heir. Shortly after moving, he took in a 14 year old boy whom he supported financially and to whom he planned to leave his estate. He officially adopted the boy in January 1988.

On 5 May 1988, during a two-week hiatus from the national tour of Drood, Rose was tortured and beaten to death by his adopted son, the boy's biological father, an uncle, and a friend of the father. The assailants tried to make the death look like a car accident, but soon confessed. Though all four were charged and spent time in prison, no trial was ever held; and eventually all were released.

Rose is buried in an unmarked grave in a cemetery near his Sosúa home.

Awards and nominations

Stage productions
 A Penny for a Song (1951)
 A Man For All Seasons (1962)
 Richard Burton's Hamlet (1964)
 Slow Dance on the Killing Ground (1964)
 The Royal Hunt of the Sun (1965)
 Walking Happy (1966)
 Loot (1968)
 Canterbury Tales (1969)
 Coco (1969)
 Sleuth (1970)
 Wise Child (1972)
 My Fat Friend (1974)
 My Fair Lady (1976)
 The Kingfisher (1978)
 Peter Pan (1979)
 The Pirates of Penzance (1981)
 You Can't Take It with You (1983)
 Dance a Little Closer (1983)
 Aren't We All? (1985)
 The Mystery of Edwin Drood (1985)

Filmography

References

External links
 
 
George Rose at Internet Off-Broadway Database

1920 births
1988 deaths
1988 crimes in the Dominican Republic
1988 murders in North America
1980s murders in the Dominican Republic
20th-century English male actors
Alumni of the Royal Central School of Speech and Drama
Drama Desk Award winners
Deaths by beating
English male film actors
English male stage actors
English male television actors
English people murdered abroad
English gay actors
Male actors from Oxfordshire
Murder in the Dominican Republic
People from Bicester
Royal Shakespeare Company members
Tony Award winners
English torture victims
British Army personnel of World War II